Kiltsi is a small borough in Väike-Maarja Parish, Lääne-Viru County, in northeastern Estonia.

At the end of the 15th century the Teutonic Knights erected a castle, which later became part of a larger one. Destroyed by a fire in 1588, the castle was not re-erected until 1789, as a neoclassical manor house, today's Kiltsi Manor.

See also
Kiltsi Manor

References

Populated places in Lääne-Viru County
Kreis Wierland
Boroughs and small boroughs in Estonia